Carl Christensen may refer to:

 Carl Frederik Albert Christensen (1872–1942), Danish systematic botanist
 Carl Christensen (soccer) (born 1956), retired American soccer defender
 Carl Peter Hermann Christensen (1869–1936), last executioner in office for the government of Denmark
 Carl L. Christensen Jr., California politician
 C. C. A. Christensen (1831–1912), Danish-American artist
 Carl C. Christensen (1891–1956), American businessman and politician